Maysville, also known as Mayville, is an unincorporated community in eastern Madison County, Alabama, United States. Maysville borders Ryland.

Demographics

Maysville appeared on the 1890 U.S. Census with a population of 218. This was the only time it appeared on the census rolls.

History
Maysville was probably named for the May family, who were early settlers of the area. The area was once cotton and corn fields, but with the high-tech boom created by NASA Marshall Space Flight Center, and the Missile Defense Agency, the area has transformed into a grouping of subdivisions such as Cooper Estates and Maysville Estates. A post office operated under the name Maysville from 1850 to 1955.

References

External links

Unincorporated communities in Alabama
Unincorporated communities in Madison County, Alabama
Huntsville-Decatur, AL Combined Statistical Area
1850 establishments in Alabama